Victor is a town in Poweshiek and Iowa counties in the U.S. state of Iowa. The population was 875 in the 2020 census, a decline from the population of 952 in 2000.

History

Victor was laid out in the 1860s. The town was originally called Wilson, after George W. Wilson, who owned the town site.

In 1872, the Moravian Church organized a mission in Victor for German-speaking settlers, and nearby organized another mission known as North English, naming this congregation after the nearby English River). The Victor congregation was associated with the larger Harmony Moravian Church, it only being eight miles away. In 1883, Moravian activity here ceased, and the little chapel (former schoolhouse) was sold for $200. Early records from these communities are available at the Moravian Archives in Bethlehem, Pennsylvania.

Geography
Victor is located at  (41.730149, -92.297167).

Demographics

2010 census
As of the census of 2010, there were 893 people, 392 households, and 244 families living in the city. The racial makeup of the city was 98.1% White, 0.1% African American, 0.3% Asian, 1.3% from other races, and 0.1% from two or more races. Hispanic or Latino of any race were 1.7% of the population.

There were 392 households, of which 29.3% had children under the age of 18 living with them, 51.5% were married couples living together, 6.9% had a female householder with no husband present, 3.8% had a male householder with no wife present, and 37.8% were non-families. 34.2% of all households were made up of individuals, and 16.8% had someone living alone who was 65 years of age or older. The average household size was 2.28 and the average family size was 2.95.

The median age in the city was 41.4 years. 25.3% of residents were under the age of 18; 5.9% were between the ages of 18 and 24; 23% were from 25 to 44; 29.4% were from 45 to 64; and 16.5% were 65 years of age or older. The gender makeup of the city was 50.2% male and 49.8% female.

2000 census
As of the census of 2000, there were 952 people, 400 households, and 280 families living in the city. The racial makeup of the city was 98.84% White, 0.21% African American, 0.53% Asian, 0.11% from other races, and 0.32% from two or more races. Hispanic or Latino of any race were 0.21% of the population.

There were 400 households, out of which 31.8% had children under the age of 18 living with them, 58.5% were married couples living together, 8.0% had a female householder with no husband present, and 30.0% were non-families. 27.3% of all households were made up of individuals, and 16.5% had someone living alone who was 65 years of age or older. The average household size was 2.38 and the average family size was 2.87.

In the city, the population was spread out, with 25.4% under the age of 18, 6.7% from 18 to 24, 24.8% from 25 to 44, 22.5% from 45 to 64, and 20.6% who were 65 years of age or older. The median age was 41 years. For every 100 females, there were 93.1 males. For every 100 females age 18 and over, there were 86.8 males.

The median income for a household in the city was $38,542, and the median income for a family was $47,841. Males had a median income of $33,021 versus $22,000 for females. The per capita income for the city was $18,837. About 4.1% of families and 7.9% of the population were below the poverty line, including 12.0% of those under age 18 and 6.7% of those age 65 or over.

Notable people

William Lawrence Adrian was a priest in Victor who became Bishop of Nashville
Jackie Collum, born in Victor, was a major league pitcher
John W. Gwynne, born in Victor, was a U.S. Representative
Leonard Raffensperger, born in Victor, was a University of Iowa football coach
Albert M. Sackett, born in Victor, was a U.S. admiral

Education
H-L-V Community School District operates area public schools.

Healthcare
Victor area residents have access to healthcare services at the Victor Health Center Clinic, located at 709 Second St. When hospitalization is required the closest and most convenient hospital for residents is Grinnell Regional Medical Center, located at 210 4th Avenue in Grinnell, Iowa.

Rolle Bolle 
Victor is home to two Rolle Bolle courts, one indoor court at B's Sports Bar and Grill and one outdoor court next to the post office. The yard game originated in Belgium (where it is known as krulbollen) and was brought over by Belgian immigrants to the United States in the late 19th and early 20th century. It is still played today by many Victor residents as well as in the nearby towns of Belle Plaine, Clutier, Marengo, Ladora, and Blairstown.

Victor Rolle Bolle Mural 
The Victor Rolle Bolle Mural overlooks Victor's outdoor courts. From 2014 to 2016, about a dozen HLV students used black and white paints to replicate four photos, which they combined into a single image. The completed mural was unveiled during Victor Fun Day, June 25, 2016, just before the start of the tournament. From left to right, the people depicted in the mural are: Bill Stevens, Camiel Holevoet, Cyril Wauters, Julius DeBrower (bolling), Daisken Cornelius, Camiel DeGeeter, Camiel DeHooge, Alfonse Van Gampleare, Daisken Cornelius, John Claeys, Henry Ahrens, and Bob DeWitte.

References

External links

Welcome to Victor, Iowa Portal style website, government, library, events and more
City-Data Comprehensive statistical data and more about Victor

Cities in Iowa
Cities in Iowa County, Iowa
Cities in Poweshiek County, Iowa
1860s establishments in Iowa